Fast Sofa is a 2001 American road-trip comedy film directed by Salomé Breziner and starring Jake Busey, Adam Goldberg, Natasha Lyonne, Crispin Glover, Bijou Phillips, Eric Roberts and Jennifer Tilly.  It is based on Bruce Craven's novel of the same name.

Cast
 Jake Busey as Rick Jeffers
 Crispin Glover as Jules Langdon
 Jennifer Tilly as Ginger Quail
 Natasha Lyonne as Tamara Jenson
 Adam Goldberg as Jack Weis
 Bijou Phillips as Tracy
 Eric Roberts as Mr. Robinson
 Glenn Shadix as Apartment Manager

References

External links
 
 

2000s comedy road movies
2001 comedy films
2001 films
American comedy road movies
Films based on American novels
Films directed by Salomé Breziner
2000s English-language films
2000s American films